Tobias Christensen may refer to:

 Tobias Christensen (footballer, born 1995), Danish footballer who plays for Vendsyssel FF
 Tobias Christensen (footballer, born 2000), Norwegian footballer who plays for Vålerenga Fotball